Glitz Style Awards was established in 2015 by Claudia Lumor. The award is held annually in Ghana to showcase both Ghanaian and International individuals and business who have outstandingly contribute to the African fashion industry.

History And Notable Events 
The first Glitz Style Awards ceremony took place in 2015 and was attended by Becca, Yvonne Nelson, Stephen Appiah, Wiyaala, The Event was hosted by Naa Ashorkor with music performances from Irene Logan.

Award Categories

External links 
Official Website.

References 

Fashion-related lists
Africa-related lists
Awards established in 2015